Pserimos is a small Greek island in the Dodecanese chain, lying between Kalymnos and Kos in front of the coast of Turkey. It is part of the municipality of Kálymnos, and reported a population of 80 inhabitants at the 2011 census.

The main industry is tourism, with Greek and other European holidaymakers attracted by its remote location. There are several beaches and a number of taverns, some of which offer accommodation.

Pserimos is served by a daily ferry from Pothia, on the island of Kalymnos, and is a destination on the itinerary of a number of cruise boats in the area.

References

External links
Official website of Municipality of Kalymnos 

Islands of Greece
Dodecanese
Kalymnos
Landforms of Kalymnos (regional unit)
Islands of the South Aegean